Eglinton—Lawrence is a federal electoral district in Ontario, Canada, that has been represented in the House of Commons of Canada since 1979.

It covers a portion of Toronto northwest of downtown. It stretches from Yonge Street in the east to Caledonia in the west and from Highway 401 in the north to Eglinton Avenue in the south. Lawrence Avenue runs through the centre of the riding. Neighbourhoods in the riding include Bedford Park, Lawrence Manor, Lawrence Heights, the southwestern part of York Mills and the western part of Lawrence Park. The riding includes portions of the former cities of North York, Toronto, and York.

As per the 2016 Census, Eglinton—Lawrence is the City of Toronto riding with the highest percentage of people of Polish ethnic origin (12.0%) and the second-highest percentage of people of Jewish ethnic origin (5.1%). In the 2011 National Household Survey more than 15% of the residents of Eglinton—Lawrence filled in a Jewish ethnic origin.

The riding was created in 1976 from parts of Eglinton, York Centre, York South, and York West.  Federally, it was represented by Liberal Joe Volpe from 1988 to 2011, by Conservative Joe Oliver from 2011 to 2015, and by Liberal Marco Mendicino since the 2015 federal election.

History

This riding's boundaries were not changed during the 2012 electoral redistribution.

Former boundaries

Demographics 
According to the Canada 2021 Census

Ethnic groups: 62.5% White, 10.9% Filipino, 5.7% Black, 4.8% Chinese, 3.9% South Asian, 3.9% Latin American, 1.5% Southeast Asian, 1.4% West Asian, 1.1% Korean

Languages: 59.5% English, 5.3% Tagalog, 3.3% Spanish, 3.1% Italian, 2.8% Portuguese, 1.7% Russian, 1.6% Mandarin, 1.3% Cantonese, 1.0% French

Religions: 48.2% Christian (28.8% Catholic, 3.5% Christian Orthodox, 2.8% Anglican, 1.8% United Church, 1.0% Pentecostal, 8.0% Other), 22.2% Jewish, 3.5% Muslim, 1.8% Hindu, 1.1% Buddhist, 22.4% None

Median income: $44,000 (2020)

Average income: $88,500 (2020)

Members of Parliament

This riding has elected the following Members of Parliament:

Election results

Toronto Council Ward 8

Eglinton—Lawrence is also the name for ward 8 on Toronto City Council currently represented by city councillor Michael Colle.

See also
 List of Canadian federal electoral districts
 Past Canadian electoral districts

References

Notes

External links
Federal riding history from the Library of Parliament
 Campaign expense data from Elections Canada

Federal electoral districts of Toronto
North York
Ontario federal electoral districts
1976 establishments in Ontario